A ganse cord is a type of cord used in millinery to give shape to a hat. It was used extensively in the 18th and 19th centuries, particularly in tricorns, bicornes and shakos used in military uniforms. The cord is tied in a special knot called Noeud de franciscain. The ganse loop made from the cord was also used to hold the cockade in place on the head covering.

Citations and notes

References
 Royal Deuxponts 104 Regiment d'Infanterie (re-enactment unit)

Military uniforms
Notions (sewing)